The 1940–41 League of Ireland was the twentieth season of the League of Ireland. St James's Gate were the defending champions.

Cork United won their first title.

Overview
Sligo Rovers resigned from the League voluntarily, resulting in a reduction in size from twelve to eleven teams.

After finishing with the same number of points, Cork United and Waterford were due to contest a Championship playoff at the Mardyke on 11 May 1941. However, Waterford refused to compete due to a failure to agree terms for the playoff and Cork United were subsequently awarded the title.

Teams

Table

Results

Championship playoff 
After finishing with the same number of points, Cork United and Waterford were due to contest a Championship playoff at the Mardyke on 11 May 1941. However, Waterford refused to compete due to a failure to agree terms for the playoff, and Cork United were subsequently awarded the title.

Top goalscorers 

Ireland
Lea
League of Ireland seasons